Javier Fernando García Duchini (born 28 November 1963 in Montevideo) is a Uruguayan physician and politician from the National Party, serving as Minister of National Defense since 1 March 2020.

Graduated from the Faculty of Medicine of the University of the Republic in 1991 with the title of doctor of medicine. He began his specialization in pediatrics. He was elected Representative on several occasions: 1994, 2004, 2009. In 2014 he was elected Senator.

Political career 
In 2004 he accompanied Jorge Larrañaga in the presidential candidacy; Together with Pablo Iturralde, they head a successful list for Montevideo. Thus, in the elections of October 2004 he is again elected deputy, this time by the National Alliance sector. 

In the municipal elections of May 2005 he was the only candidate of the National Party to Intendant of Montevideo.  In the 2009 primary elections, he again supported the candidacy of Jorge Larrañaga as a candidate for the presidency of the National Party; He led List 40.  At the end of December 2012, García announced his separation from the National Alliance sector and joined the Luis Alberto Lacalle Pou team, then a presidential candidate for the 2014 primaries.  

In the 2019 general election, Garcia was the second Senator candidate on the Space 40 list, which is headed by Luis Lacalle Pou. He was elected Senator of the Republic.  After the victory of Lacalle Pou, he was appointed Minister of National Defense, a position he assumed on March 1, 2020.

Controversies 
On November 18, 2016, Semanario Brecha indicated that García had avoided clarifying in different press releases that he did not have the title of pediatrician that was awarded to him.  In an interview with that newspaper, Garcia admitted that he did not possess the pediatrician title stating "I do not award myself or let myself be awarded" and denounced what he considered an attack on his person.

Personal life 
He is married to Rosana Supparo and has three children: Belén, Alfonso and Delfina.

References

External links

Living people
1963 births
Uruguayan people of Spanish descent
Uruguayan people of Italian descent
University of the Republic (Uruguay) alumni
Uruguayan pediatricians
National Party (Uruguay) politicians
Defence ministers of Uruguay